Psyllacarus is a genus of mites in the family Acaridae.

Species
 Psyllacarus subellipticus Fain, F. Bartholomaeus, B. Cooke & J. C. Beaucournu, 1990

References

Acaridae